Ghamrah may refer to:

 Ghamrah, Saudi Arabia
 Ghamra, Egypt, also spelled Ghamrah, a district of Cairo and a station on the Cairo Metro